The 1974 All-Ireland Minor Football Championship was the 43rd staging of the All-Ireland Minor Football Championship, the Gaelic Athletic Association's premier inter-county Gaelic football tournament for boys under the age of 18.

Tyrone entered the championship as defending champions, however, they were defeated in the Ulster Championship.

On 22 September 1974, Cork won the championship following a 1-10 to 1-6 defeat of Mayo in the All-Ireland final. This was their sixth All-Ireland title overall and their first in two championship seasons.

Results

Connacht Minor Football Championship

Quarter-Finals

Leitrim 1-15 Sligo 1-3 Dr Hyde Park Roscommon

Semi-Finals

Rosocmmon 2-8 Leitrim 1-10 Pearse Stadium Galway

Mayo 2-15 Galway 2-5 McHale Park Castlebar

Final

Mayo 4-12 Roscommon 2-3 McHale Castlebar.

Leinster Minor Football Championship

Munster Minor Football Championship

Ulster Minor Football Championship

All-Ireland Minor Football Championship

Semi-finals

Final

Championship statistics

Miscellaneous

 Wicklow win the Leinster Championship for the first and only time in their history.
 Cork achieve the double for the third time in their history, after earlier winning the All-Ireland Minor Hurling Championship. Finbarr Delaney, Tom Cashman, Dermot McCurtain, Johnny Crowley, Tadhg Murphy and Declan Murphy claim winners' medals in both All-Ireland victories.

References

1974
All-Ireland Minor Football Championship